is a Japanese gunka composed by  with lyrics by   in 1885. Upon the request of the Japanese government, Leroux adapted it along with another gunka, into the military march  in 1912.

Background 
The song references the Battōtai who fought in the Battle of Tabaruzaka during the 1877 Satsuma Rebellion. Because of supply problems and heavy rains, the Satsuma rebels were forced to engage with the Imperial Japanese Army in hand-to-hand combat. They inflicted heavy casualties against Imperial forces, who were mostly conscripts with no experience in wielding swords. Lieutenant General Yamagata Aritomo selected and deployed men from the surrounding area who were proficient with swords. He named this unit Battōtai or "Drawn-Sword regiment."

Composition
Charles Leroux, a bandmaster and composer born in Paris, arrived in Japan in 1884 as part of a French military advisory group. He composed his "Battōtai" in 1885, while serving as bandmaster of the Imperial Japanese Army Band. The song was first publicly performed the same year at a concert hosted by the Greater Japan Music Society at the Rokumeikan. It was considered the first Western-style military song in Japan and the first to become popular across the country, although it was initially believed to be difficult to sing for Japanese unaccustomed to modulation.

Lyrics

Score

References

Japanese marches
Japanese patriotic songs